Eight ships of the Royal Navy have been named HMS Devonshire, originally in honour of William Cavendish, 1st Duke of Devonshire, and later after the county of Devonshire (now called Devon).

 was an 80-gun third rate launched in 1692 and blown up in action with the French in 1707 at the Battle at the Lizard.
 was an 80-gun third rate, launched in 1710, hulked in 1740, and sold in 1760.
 was a 74-gun third rate launched in 1745 and broken up in 1772.
 was a fire ship purchased in 1804 and expended on 3 October of that year at Boulogne-sur-Mer.
 was a 74-gun third rate launched in 1812, on harbour service from 1849, and broken up in 1869.
 was a  armoured cruiser launched in 1904 and sold in 1921.
 was a  heavy cruiser launched in 1927, converted to a training ship in 1947, and sold in 1954.
 was a  guided missile destroyer launched in 1960 and sunk as a target in 1984.

Battle honours
Ships named Devonshire have earned the following battle honours:

Barfleur, 1692
Finisterre, 1747
Ushant, 1747
Louisburg, 1758
Martinique, 1762
Havana, 1762
Norway, 1940
Arctic, 1941
Diego Suarez, 1942

In film
The James Bond film Tomorrow Never Dies features a fictional Type 23 frigate named HMS Devonshire, sunk by Elliot Carver's stealth ship.

See also

Royal Navy ship names